York is an unincorporated community in York Township, Steuben County, in the U.S. state of Indiana.

History
A post office was established at York in 1839, and remained in operation until 1907. An old variant name of the community was called Hathaway.

Geography

References

Unincorporated communities in Steuben County, Indiana
Unincorporated communities in Indiana